Myrmecocystus mendax is a species of ant in the family Formicidae. It occurs in Mexico and Southwestern United States.

References

Further reading

 

Formicinae
Hymenoptera of North America
Insects of Mexico
Insects of the United States
Taxa named by William Morton Wheeler
Insects described in 1908
Articles created by Qbugbot